Cola umbratilis is a species of tropical rainforest tree in the family Malvaceae. It is endemic to the wet evergreen forests of Côte d'Ivoire and Ghana where it is threatened by habitat loss.

References

umbratilis
Flora of Ivory Coast
Flora of Ghana
Trees of Africa
Vulnerable flora of Africa
Taxonomy articles created by Polbot
Taxa named by Ronald William John Keay